The 1998–99 CERH European League was the 35th edition of the CERH European League organized by CERH. Its Final Four was held on 1 and 2 May 1999 in Igualada, Spain.

Preliminary round

|}

First round

|}

Group stage
In each group, teams played against each other home-and-away in a home-and-away round-robin format.

The two first qualified teams advanced to the Final Four.

Group A

Group B

Final four
The Final Four was played in the Poliesportiu Les Comes, Igualada, Spain.

Igualada achieved their sixth title.

Bracket

References

External links
 CERH website

1998 in roller hockey
1999 in roller hockey
Rink Hockey Euroleague